Tessa Benoit (born March 17, 1977) is an American cross-country skier. She competed in two events at the 2002 Winter Olympics. Born in Hanover, New Hampshire, but raised in South Pomfret, Vermont Benoit also competed collegiately for the University of Vermont ski team.

Cross-country skiing results
All results are sourced from the International Ski Federation (FIS).

Olympic Games

World Championships

a.  Cancelled due to extremely cold weather.

World Cup

Season standings

References

External links
 

1977 births
Living people
American female cross-country skiers
Olympic cross-country skiers of the United States
Cross-country skiers at the 2002 Winter Olympics
People from Hanover, New Hampshire
Sportspeople from Vermont
University of Vermont alumni
Vermont Catamounts skiers
21st-century American women